Sarsfieldstown Cross is a wayside cross and National Monument located in County Meath, Ireland.

Location

Description

Sarsfieldstown Cross is a late 16th-century memorial cross erected to remember Christopher Barnewall (1522–1575). The cross remains as a fragment of a shaft with figure sculpture in false relief and inscription. The inscription in Latin around the base reads: "Archbishop Octavian, Primate of all Ireland, has granted an indulgence in perpetuity, to every penitent, as often as they shall devoutly say an Our Father, and a Hail Mary, for the souls of Christopher Barnewall; Kt, and Elizabeth Plunket, and all the faithful departed."

References

Archaeological sites in County Meath
National Monuments in County Meath